Kimberley Downs Station, commonly referred to as Kimberley Downs, is a pastoral lease that operates as a cattle station in Western Australia.

Location
It is accessed via the Gibb River Road.

The Lennard River flows through the property, and a neighbouring property is Meda Station.

The land is a mix of black soil plains with a high cracking black clay content. These areas are grassed with bundle bundle grass, ribbon grass, Flinders grass and feathertop wiregrass. There is also a large area of open woodland.

History
The property was established in the early 1880s. In 1900 M. C. Davies, who owned neighbouring Balmaningarra Station, also acquired Lennard River Station and a portion of Lillimilura Station, forming Kimberley Downs Station. Davies later owned and managed both Kimberley Downs and Napier Downs Stations.

Eight white men were employed permanently on the property with the bulk of the work being carried out by Aboriginal workers.

The entire flock was sold off from the property in 1916. 11,400 ewes, 4,400 wethers and 340 rams were sold in one lot, thought to be the largest sale of sheep in one line at the time in Western Australia. The property was stocked with cattle and soon after the cattle tick first appeared in the West Kimberley regions. Kimberley Downs, Yeeda and Obagama were all affected by the ticks.

In 1931 80 head of cattle were found to have pleuropneumonia in one muster. The disease meant cattle had to be quarantined.

In 1976 the property, along with neighbouring Napier Downs, was owned by the Australian Land and Cattle Company and being managed by Bob and Sheryl McCorry.

See also
List of ranches and stations

References

Stations (Australian agriculture)
Pastoral leases in Western Australia
Kimberley (Western Australia)